Agelena lukla is a species of spider in the family Agelenidae, which contains at least 1,350 species of funnel-web spiders . It was first described by Nishikawa, in 1980. It is primarily found in Nepal.

References

lukla
Spiders described in 1980
Arthropods of Nepal
Spiders of Asia